Raymond Leslie White (October 23, 1943 – October 2018) was an American geneticist.

Biography
Born in Orlando, Florida in 1943, White earned a bachelor's degree in microbiology from the University of Oregon and obtained a doctorate, also in microbiology, from the Massachusetts Institute of Technology in 1971. He taught at the University of Utah School of Medicine and later moved to the University of California, San Francisco as Rudi Schmid Distinguished Professor in Neurology and was a Howard Hughes Medical Investigator from 1980 to 1994.

Honors and awards
In 1989, White received the William Allan Award, followed by the Charles S. Mott Prize in 1990, which he shared with Webster Cavenee. White was one of three recipients of the Rosenstiel Award in 1991, alongside David Botstein and Ronald W. Davis. In 1993, White was one of five in the field of academia to be honored with a Utah Governor's Medal for Science and Technology. White was granted membership to the National Academy of Sciences and the American Academy of Arts and Sciences in 1992 and 2005, respectively.

References

1943 births
2018 deaths
American geneticists
Massachusetts Institute of Technology School of Science alumni
University of Oregon alumni
University of Utah School of Medicine faculty
Members of the United States National Academy of Sciences
University of California, San Francisco faculty
Howard Hughes Medical Investigators
Scientists from Florida
People from Orlando, Florida
Members of the National Academy of Medicine